Titoism is a socialist political philosophy most closely associated with Josip Broz Tito during the Cold War. It is characterized by a broad Yugoslav identity, workers' self-management, a political separation from the Soviet Union, and leadership in the Non-Aligned Movement.

Tito led the Communist Yugoslav Partisans during World War II in Yugoslavia. After the war, tensions arose between Yugoslavia and the Soviet Union. Although these issues diminished over time, Yugoslavia still remained relatively independent in thought and policy due to the leadership of Tito. Tito led Yugoslavia until his death in 1980.

Today, the term "Titoism" is sometimes used to refer to Yugo-nostalgia, a longing for reestablishment or revival of Yugoslavism or Yugoslavia by the citizens of Yugoslavia's successor states.

Background 

Initially a personal favourite of USSR, Tito led the national liberation war to the Nazi occupation during the WW2, where the Yugoslav Partisans liberated Yugoslavia with only limited help from the Red Army. Tito met with the Soviet leadership several times immediately after the war to negotiate the future of Yugoslavia. Initially aligned with Soviet policy, over time, these negotiations became less cordial because Tito had the intention neither of handing over executive power nor of accepting foreign intervention or influence (a position Tito later continued within the Non-Aligned Movement).

The Yugoslav regime first pledged allegiance, from 1945 to 1948, to Stalinism. But according to the Trotskyist (hence anti-Stalinist) historian Jean-Jacques Marie, Stalin had planned to liquidate Tito as early as the end of the 1930s, and again after the Spanish Civil War, during which Tito participated in the recruitment and to the organization of the Dimitrov Battalion, a Balkan unit of the International Brigades, some of whose ex-combatants will be assassinated by the Soviets.

Tito angered Stalin by agreeing with the projects of Bulgarian leader Georgi Dimitrov, which meant to merge the two Balkan countries into a Balkan Federation. This led to the 1947 cooperation agreement signed in Bled (Dimitrov also pressured Romania to join such a federation, expressing his beliefs during a visit to Bucharest in early 1948). The Bled agreement, also referred to as the "Tito–Dimitrov treaty", was signed 1 August 1947 in Bled, Slovenia. It foresaw also unification between Vardar Macedonia and Pirin Macedonia and return of Western Outlands to Bulgaria. The policies resulting from the agreement were reversed after the Tito–Stalin split in June 1948, when Bulgaria was being subordinated to the interests of the Soviet Union and took a stance against Yugoslavia.

The policy of regional blocs had been the norm in Comintern policies, displaying Soviet resentment of the nation state in Eastern Europe and of the consequences of Paris Peace Conference. With the 1943 dissolution of Comintern and the subsequent advent of the Cominform came Stalin's dismissal of the previous ideology, and adaptation to the conditions created for Soviet hegemony during the Cold War.

Tito-Stalin split 

Moreover, Stalin did not have free rein in Yugoslavia as he did in other countries of the Fourth Moscow Conference on the partition of Europe; the USSR had not obtained preponderance there, but only 50% influence, so that Tito benefited from a margin of maneuver far greater than that of the other Southeast European leaders.

When the rest of Eastern Europe became satellite states of the Soviet Union, Yugoslavia refused to accept the 1948 Resolution of the Cominform which condemned the leaders of the League of Communists of Yugoslavia for allegedly abandoning Marxism-Leninism, and any communists who sympathised with Yugoslavia. The period from 1948 to 1955, known as the Informbiro, was marked by severe repression of opponents and many others accused of pro-Stalin attitudes being sent to the penal camp on Goli Otok in Yugoslavia. Likewise, real and accused Titoists or 'Titoites' were met with similar treatment in Eastern Bloc countries, which furthermore served to publicize the dangers of challenging subservience to Moscow, as well as to purge 'unwanted' individuals from their Communist parties.

Ideology 

Elements of Titoism are characterized by policies and practices based on the principle that in each country the means of attaining ultimate communist goals must be dictated by the conditions of that particular country, rather than by a pattern set in another country. During Josip Broz Tito's era, this specifically meant that the communist goal should be pursued independently of and often in opposition to the policies of the Soviet Union.

It is distinct from Joseph Stalin's "socialism in one country" theory, as Tito advocated cooperation between nations through the Non-Aligned Movement while at the same time pursuing socialism in whatever ways best suited particular nations. In contrast, "socialism in one country" focused on fast industrialisation and modernisation, in order to compete with what Stalin perceived as the more advanced nations of the West. During Tito's era, his ideas specifically meant that the communist goal should be pursued independently of (and often in opposition to) what he referred to as the Stalinist and imperialist policies of the Soviet Union. Through this split and subsequent policies some commentators have grouped Titoism with Eurocommunism or reform communism. It was also meant to demonstrate the viability of a third way between the capitalist United States and the socialist Soviet Union.

In fact, on the economic level, Tito simply took note of the inability of the Stalinist-type centralized economy to meet human needs, several years before Nikita Khrushchev and Mikhail Gorbachev in the USSR, before Imre Nagy in Hungary and Deng Xiaoping in China.

Throughout his time in office, Tito prided himself on Yugoslavia's independence from the Soviet Union, with Yugoslavia never accepting full membership in Comecon and Tito's open rejection of many aspects of Stalinism as the most obvious manifestations of this. The Soviets and their satellite states often accused Yugoslavia of Trotskyism and social democracy, charges loosely based on Tito's socialist self-management, attempts at greater democratization, and the theory of associated labor (profit sharing policies and worker-owned industries initiated by him, Milovan Đilas and Edvard Kardelj in 1950). It was in these things that the Soviet leadership accused of harboring the seeds of council communism or even corporatism.

Additionally, Yugoslavia joined the US-sponsored Balkan Pact in July 1953, a military alliance with two NATO member states — Greece and Turkey. The pact had been signed a few days before Stalin died, and the new Soviet government failed to develop any response. However, it was continually met with opposition by Albanian leader Enver Hoxha, who criticised Tito and Yugoslavia for being agents of American imperialism.

Some Trotskyists considered Tito to be an 'unconscious Trotskyist' because of the split with Stalin. However, some Trotskyist propagandists claimed that there were no fundamental difference in principles between Stalin and Tito, despite a great deal of evidence suggesting the contrary. Most notably, Trotskyist writer Ted Grant published several articles slandering both leaders in the British Trotskyist newspaper of which he was the editor.

The "Titoist" regime adopted a policy of economic "self-management", generalized from 1950, wishing to put the means of production under social ownership of direct producers, thus excluding the formation of a bureaucracy as was the case in other communist regimes.

The propaganda attacks centered on the caricature of "Tito the Butcher" of the working class, aimed to pinpoint him as a covert agent of Western imperialism, pointing to Tito's partial cooperation with imperialist nations. Tito was in fact welcomed by Western powers as an ally.

History 

From 1949 the central government began to cede power to communal local governments, seeking to decentralise the government and work towards a withering away of the state. In the system of local self-government, higher-level bodies could supervise compliance with the law by lower-level bodies, but could not issue orders to them. Rankovićism disagreed with this decentralisation, viewing it as a threat to the stability of Yugoslavia.

The League of Communists of Yugoslavia retained solid power; the legislature did little more than rubber stamp decisions already made by the LCY's Politburo. The secret police, the State Security Administration (UDBA), while operating with considerably more restraint than its counterparts in the rest of Eastern Europe, was nonetheless a feared tool of government control. UDBA was particularly notorious for assassinating suspected "enemies of the state" who lived in exile overseas. The media remained under restrictions that were onerous by Western standards, but still had more latitude than their counterparts in other Communist countries. Nationalist groups were a particular target of the authorities, with numerous arrests and prison sentences handed down over the years for separatist activities.
Although the Soviets revised their attitudes under Nikita Khrushchev during the process of de-Stalinization and sought to normalize relations with the Yugoslavs while obtaining influence in the Non-Aligned Movement, the answer they got was never enthusiastic and the Soviet Union never gained a proper outlet to the Mediterranean Sea. At the same time, the Non-Aligned states failed to form a third Bloc, especially after the split at the outcome of the 1973 oil crisis.

Industry was nationalized, agriculture forcibly collectivized, and a rigid industrialization program based on the Soviet model was adopted. Yugoslav and Soviet companies signed contracts for numerous joint ventures. According to the American historian Adam Ulam, in no other country in the Eastern Bloc was Sovietization "as rapid and as ruthless as in Yugoslavia".

Leonid Brezhnev's conservative attitudes yet again chilled relations between the two countries (although they never degenerated to the level of the conflict with Stalin). Yugoslavia backed Czechoslovakia's leader Alexander Dubček during the 1968 Prague Spring and then cultivated a special (albeit incidental) relation with the maverick Romanian President Nicolae Ceaușescu. Titoism was similar to Dubček's socialism with a human face while Ceaușescu attracted sympathies for his refusal to condone (and take part in) the Soviet invasion of Czechoslovakia, which briefly seemed to constitute a casus belli between Romania and the Soviets. However, Ceaușescu was an unlikely member of the alliance since he profited from the events in order to push his authoritarian agenda inside Romania.

After Brezhnev brought Czechoslovakia to heel in 1968, Romania and Yugoslavia maintained privileged connections up to the mid-1980s. Ceaușescu adapted the part of Titoism that made reference to the "conditions of a particular country", but merged them with Romanian nationalism and contrasting North Korean Juche beliefs while embarking on a particular form of Cultural Revolution. The synthesis can be roughly compared with the parallel developments of Hoxhaism and found Ceaușescu strong, perhaps unsought, supporters in National Bolshevism theorists such as the Belgian Jean-François Thiriart.

Tito's own ideology became less clear with the pressures of various nationalisms within Yugoslavia and the problems posed by the 1970s Croatian Spring. In terms of economics, Yugoslavia became somewhat closer to a free market, neatly separated from other socialist regimes in Eastern Europe (and marked by a permissive attitude towards seasonal labor of Yugoslav citizens in Western Europe). At the same time, the leadership did put a stop to overt capitalist attempts (such as Stjepan Mesić's experiment with privatization in Orahovica) and crushed the dissidence of liberal thinkers such as former leader Milovan Đilas while it also clamped down on centrifugal attempts, promoting a Yugoslav patriotism.

Although still claimed as official policies, virtually all aspects of Titoism went into rapid decline after Tito's death in 1980, being replaced by the rival policies of constituent republics. During the late 1980s, with nationalism on the rise, revised Titoism was arguably kept as a point of reference by political movements caught disadvantaged by the main trends, such as civic forums in Bosnia and Herzegovina and North Macedonia.

Reception 

Titoism was and is received very differently. During Stalin's lifetime, the Soviet Union and Eastern Bloc countries reacted with undisguised hostility. Participants in alleged Titoist conspiracies, such as the GDR historian Walter Markov, were subjected to reprisals, and some were even put through staged show trials that ended with death sentences, such as the Rajk trial in Budapest in 1949 or the Slánský trial in Prague in 1952. In France the Cominform ordered the central committee of the French Communist Party to condemn "Titoism" in 1948 With prominent members such as  writing of the need to hunt down "Titoist spies" within the party. After Stalin's death, the Soviet conspiracy theories around Titoism subsided. In the mid-1950s, Yugoslavia and the Soviet Union even temporarily converged again. Nevertheless, Titoism was later condemned as revisionism in the Eastern bloc.

Titoism has sometimes been referred to as a form of "national communism", a variant of nationalism. However, Walker Connor says that Titoism is more akin to "state communism", as the loyalty is to a state comprising multiple nations. Nationalism was therefore a threat to Titoism.

In Marxist circles in the West, it was considered a form of Western socialism alongside Eurocommunism, with it being appreciated by left-wing intellectuals who were breaking away from the Soviet-line in the 1960s. In the 1960s, political scientists understood it as a socialist form of patriotism. Adam Ulam sees him more critically and writes that Titoism has always "retained its (albeit mild) totalitarian one-party character".

Muammar Gaddafi's Third International Theory, outlined in his Green Book which informed Libyan national policy from its formation in 1975 until Gaddafi's downfall in 2011, was heavily inspired by and shared many similarities with Titoism and Yugoslav workers' self-management.

Titoism gained influence in the communist parties in the 1940s, including Poland (Władysław Gomułka), Hungary (László Rajk, Imre Nagy), Bulgaria (Traicho Kostov), Czechoslovakia (Vladimír Clementis) and Romania (Lucrețiu Pătrășcanu).

See also 

 Economy of the former Yugoslavia
 Market socialism
 Worker cooperative
 Praxis School
 Soviet Union–Yugoslavia relations
 Total National Defense (Yugoslavia)
 Yugoslavism
 Yugo-nostalgia
 Yugoslavs

References

Bibliography

Further reading 
 Tony Cliff. Background to Hungary (July 1958). Marxists Internet Archive. A contemporary Trotskyist perspective on Tito's clash with Moscow.
 Mircea Rusnac. "Procesul partizanilor anticomunisti din Banat 1949". Banaterra.eu.
 Mircea Rusnac. "Deportarea banatenilor Baragan 1951 din perspectiva istorica". Banaterra.eu.
 Vesna Peric Zimonjic (4 June 2009). "Balkans: Flirting With Marx, for Old Times' Sake". Inter Press Service. Ipsnews.net.

Communism in North Macedonia
Josip Broz Tito
Eponymous political ideologies
Politics of Yugoslavia
Socialist Federal Republic of Yugoslavia
League of Communists of Yugoslavia
State ideologies
Types of socialism
Anti-Stalinist left